Reckless is an album by the American blues guitarist and singer Luther Allison, released in 1997.

Critical reception

Cub Koda, for AllMusic, stated: "Luther's third album for Alligator finds the 50-something bluesman truly at the peak of his powers. His superb guitar playing has never been more focused, and his singing shows a fervent shouter in full command ... The production by Jim Gaines delivers a modern-sounding album that stays firmly in the blues tradition while giving full vent to Luther's penchant for blending soul, rock and funk grooves into his musical stew."

Track listing
All tracks composed by Luther Allison and James Solberg; except where indicated
"Low Down and Dirty" (Bernard Allison) - 3:45
"You Can Run but You Can't Hide" (Paul Butterfield, Henry Glover) - 3:32
"Living in the House of the Blues" (Jerry Williams) - 5:32
"You Can, You Can" - 3:42
"Will It Ever Change?" - 5:09
"Just As I Am" (duet with Marla Glen)- 4:55
"There Comes a Time" - 4:12
"Drowning at the Bottom" - 3:54
"Playin' a Losin' Game" (B. Allison, L. Allison) - 5:30
"It's a Blues Thing" - 5:40
"Cancel My Check" - 4:19
"Pain in the Streets" - 4:43
"You're Gonna Make Me Cry" (Deadric Malone) - 6:13
"I'm Back" - 4:12

Personnel
Musicians
Luther Allison – guitar, vocals
Lloyd Allison – drums
Kurt Clayton – electric piano
Ken Faltinson – bass
Marla Glen – harmonica
Willie Hayes – drums
Wayne Jackson – trombone, trumpet
Darin James – drums
Andrew Love – tenor saxophone
Steve Potts – drums
Dave Smith – bass
James Solberg – guitar
Rick Steff – organ, piano
Mike Vlahakis – organ, piano
Production
Produced by Jim Gaines

Chart positions

References

1997 albums
Alligator Records albums
Luther Allison albums